Bohdan Lytvyak (born 5 May 1998) is a Ukrainian football midfielder.

Career
Lytvyak is a product of his native Kryvbas Kryvyi Rih youth sportive system.

He made his debut in the Ukrainian Premier League for Inhulets Petrove as a second half-time substituted player in a home drawing match against FC Mariupol on 25 October 2020.

References

External links
 Statistics at UAF website (Ukr)
 

1998 births
Living people
Sportspeople from Kryvyi Rih
Ukrainian footballers
FC Oleksandriya players
Ukrainian Premier League players
Ukrainian First League players
Ukrainian Second League players
FC Kremin Kremenchuk players
FC Inhulets Petrove players
FC Hirnyk-Sport Horishni Plavni players
FC Peremoha Dnipro players
Association football midfielders